Club Zanzibar was a dance club that opened in 1979 at 430 Broad Street in Newark, New Jersey.  Its presence in Downtown Newark was noted for its influence on house music and garage house genres and scene.  Club Zanzibar, along with other gay and straight clubs in the era, was both a straight and LGBT black and Latino nightlife destination.

The Jersey Sound
DJ Tony Humphries began his residency at the club in 1982 and, along with others, helped "spawn the sometimes raw but always soulful, gospel-infused subgenre" of house music known as the Jersey sound. The club scene also gave rise to the ball culture scene in Newark hotels and nightclubs.

New Jersey artists like Jomanda found success on the house music scene.

Abigail Adams's house-music record label and store, Movin’ Records in adjacent East Orange, New Jersey was another contributor to the sound.

Well-known deep house DJ Kerri Chandler was also a resident DJ at the club. His girlfriend was brutally attacked and killed by another man outside the club in a horrific attack in the 1980s.

Some have said that "when New York went to rap [during this period], Jersey stayed with club. Because of Zanzibar.”

The sound was exported to London during the era and eagerly devoured by house music enthusiasts across the pond.

The music video for K-YZE's "Stomp (Move Jump Jack Your Body)" was filmed at the Zanzibar in 1989.

History
The club opened in 1979.  The sound system was developed, designed, and installed by Richard Long of Richard Long & Associates (RLA).  The club transitioned to hip-hop in the 1990s, rebranding as Brick City, and eventually closed.

In 1988, Paris Dupree held her famous Paris Is Burning ball at the club, namesake to the famous film.

Newark-area annual summer events like the Roselle House Music Festival in Warinanco Park, the Weequahic Park House Music Festival, and the Lincoln Park Music Festival serve as unofficial "Zans" reunions.

Performers 
Notable performers who have played "the Zanzibar" include:
Larry Levan
Jomanda
Tony Humphries
François Kevorkian
Tee Scott
David Morales
Grace Jones
Kool & the Gang
Whitney Houston
Patti LaBelle
Fonda Rae
Gloria Gaynor
Vicki Sue Robinson
Linda Clifford
Crystal Waters
Jocelyn Brown
CeCe Rogers
Millie Jackson
Sharon Redd
Kerri Chandler
Loleatta Holloway
Thelma Houston
Nona Hendryx
Sugarhill Gang
Indeep
Gwen Guthrie
Chaka Khan
Sylvester
Paris Dupree
The Weather Girls
CeCe Peniston
Queen Latifah
Central Line
Debbie Jacobs
Blaze
Five Star
Modern Romance
Aly-Us
Rockers Revenge

Building
The Lincoln Motel, which housed Club Zanzibar, was torn down in 2007 as one contemporary developer called it a “ blemished, rat-infested drug-haven eyesore."  It had degenerated into a notorious hotspot for crime, drug abuse, prostitution, murder and violence. Its owner, Miles Berger of the Berger Organization, was also the owner of a number of welfare hotels at the time throughout the city. "For a time, arrests were so common that a motel floor plan graced the wall of the public defender’s office to assist lawyers juggling cases. Then-Mayor Cory Booker manned the bulldozer that began the building's demolition in 2007."

In the 1980s, Mr. Berger had turned its 200 rooms into a haven for welfare recipients, earning about $1,000 a month per person."  Berger's Berger Organization has expressed interest in building a casino on the site.

See also
New Jersey house
List of electronic dance music venues

References

1979 establishments in New Jersey
1979 in LGBT history
Ball culture
Buildings and structures demolished in 2007
Companies established in 1979
Culture of Newark, New Jersey
Defunct LGBT nightclubs in the United States
LGBT history in New Jersey
LGBT nightclubs in New Jersey
Demolished buildings and structures in New Jersey
Electronic dance music venues
LGBT African-American culture
Music venues in New Jersey